The North American Plate is a tectonic plate covering most of North America, Cuba, the Bahamas, extreme northeastern Asia, and parts of Iceland and the Azores.

It extends eastward to the Mid-Atlantic Ridge and westward to the Chersky Range in eastern Siberia. The plate includes both continental and oceanic crust. The interior of the main continental landmass includes an extensive granitic core called a craton. Along most of the edges of this craton are fragments of crustal material called terranes, which are accreted to the craton by tectonic actions over a long span of time. It is thought that much of North America west of the Rocky Mountains is composed of such terranes.

Boundaries
The southern boundary with the Cocos Plate to the west and the Caribbean Plate to the east is a transform fault, represented by the Swan Islands Transform Fault under the Caribbean Sea and the Motagua Fault through Guatemala.  The parallel Septentrional and Enriquillo–Plantain Garden faults, which run through the island of Hispaniola and bound the Gonâve Microplate, are also a part of the boundary.  The rest of the southerly margin which extends east to the Mid Atlantic Ridge and marks the boundary between the North American Plate and the South American Plate is vague but located near the Fifteen-Twenty Fracture Zone around 16°n.

On the northerly boundary is a continuation of the Mid-Atlantic ridge called the Gakkel Ridge.  The rest of the boundary in the far northwestern part of the plate extends into Siberia.  This boundary continues from the end of the Gakkel Ridge as the Laptev Sea Rift, on to a transitional deformation zone in the Chersky Range, then the Ulakhan Fault between it and the Okhotsk Plate, and finally the Aleutian Trench to the end of the Queen Charlotte Fault system.

The westerly boundary is the Queen Charlotte Fault running offshore along the coast of Alaska and the Cascadia subduction zone to the north, the San Andreas Fault through California, the East Pacific Rise in the Gulf of California, and the Middle America Trench to the south.

On its western edge, the Farallon Plate has been subducting under the North American Plate since the Jurassic Period. The Farallon Plate has almost completely subducted beneath the western portion of the North American Plate, leaving that part of the North American Plate in contact with the Pacific Plate as the San Andreas Fault. The Juan de Fuca, Explorer, Gorda, Rivera, Cocos and Nazca plates are remnants of the Farallon Plate. 

The boundary along the Gulf of California is complex. The Gulf is underlain by the Gulf of California Rift Zone, a series of rift basins and transform fault segments from the northern end of the East Pacific Rise in the mouth of the gulf to the San Andreas Fault system in the vicinity of the Salton Trough rift/Brawley seismic zone.  

It is generally accepted that a piece of the North American Plate was broken off and transported north as the East Pacific Rise propagated northward, creating the Gulf of California.  However, it is as yet unclear whether the oceanic crust between the Rise and the mainland coast of Mexico is actually a new plate beginning to converge with the North American Plate, consistent with the standard model of rift zone spreading centers generally.

Hotspots
A few hotspots are thought to exist below the North American Plate. The most notable hotspots are the Yellowstone (Wyoming), Jemez Lineament (New Mexico), and Anahim (British Columbia) hotspots. These are thought to be caused by a narrow stream of hot mantle convecting up from the Earth's core–mantle boundary called a mantle plume, although some geologists think that upper mantle convection is a more likely cause. The Yellowstone and Anahim hotspots are thought to have first arrived during the Miocene period and are still geologically active, creating earthquakes and volcanoes. The Yellowstone hotspot is most notable for the Yellowstone Caldera and the many calderas that lie in the Snake River Plain while the Anahim hotspot is most notable for the Anahim Volcanic Belt, currently found in the Nazko Cone area.

Plate motion
For the most part, the North American Plate moves in roughly a southwest direction away from the Mid-Atlantic Ridge at a rate of about 2.3 centimeters (~1 inch) per year. At the same time, the Pacific Plate is moving to the northwest at a speed of between 7 and 11 centimeters (~3-4 inches) a year. 

The motion of the plate cannot be driven by subduction as no part of the North American Plate is being subducted, except for a small section comprising part of the Puerto Rico Trench; thus other mechanisms continue to be investigated.

One recent study suggests that a mantle convective current is propelling the plate.

See also
 Geologic timeline of Western North America
 New Madrid Seismic Zone, an ancient intraplate fault zone within the North American Plate, notable as early as 1699

References
Notes

Tectonic plates
Geology of North America
Geology of Russia
Geology of Greenland
Geology of California
Geology of Iceland
Geology of the Atlantic Ocean
Geology of the Pacific Ocean